Alin Ionuț Cârstocea (born 16 January 1992) is a Romanian footballer who plays as a midfielder for Gloria Buzău.

International career
Cârstocea played with the Romania U-19 at the 2011 UEFA European Under-19 Football Championship, which took place in Romania. He made his debut for under-19 team in the same tournament on 20 July 2011 in a game against Czech Republic U-19.

Honours
Viitorul Constanța
Liga III: 2009–10

FC Voluntari
Liga II: 2014–15

Farul Constanța
Liga III: 2017–18

Rapid București
Liga III: 2018–19

References

External links
 
 

1992 births
Living people
People from Năvodari
Romanian footballers
Association football midfielders
Romania youth international footballers
Romania under-21 international footballers
Liga I players
Liga II players
FC Viitorul Constanța players
FC Voluntari players
ACS Poli Timișoara players
FC Botoșani players
FC UTA Arad players
FCV Farul Constanța players
FC Rapid București players
FC Dunărea Călărași players
FC Gloria Buzău players